Dr. Evan Alexander Erwin House is a historic home located at Laurinburg, Scotland County, North Carolina. It was built in 1904, and extensively remodeled in 1939 in the Classical Revival style. It is a two-story, five bay, double pile, frame dwelling, with one-story side-gable flanking side wings. It features a two-story front porch with a flat roof and supported by four square slender wood columns with Tuscan order caps.  Also on the property is a contributing two car garage.

It was added to the National Register of Historic Places in 2007.

References

Houses on the National Register of Historic Places in North Carolina
Neoclassical architecture in North Carolina
Houses completed in 1939
Houses in Scotland County, North Carolina
National Register of Historic Places in Scotland County, North Carolina